Sujatha Mohan (credited as Sujatha) is an Indian playback singer who is popular for singing in Malayalam, Tamil and Telugu movies. She has also sung for Kannada, Badaga, Hindi and Marathi and more languages movies. In a career spanning 48 years, she has recorded more than 20,000 songs to date.

Personal life

Sujatha Mohan is the granddaughter of Parur T. K. Narayana Pillai, the first Chief Minister of the erstwhile Travancore-Cochin State after India gained Independence. Her father, the late Dr. Vijayendran died when she was two years old. She completed her graduation in Economics from the St. Teresa's College, Ernakulam. She married Dr. V. Krishna Mohan on 9 May 1981. Her only daughter, Shweta Mohan, is also a singer. Radhika Thilak and G. Venugopal are her cousins.

Career

Sujatha shot to fame in the seventies as Baby Sujatha, the schoolgirl who regularly used to sing with K. J. Yesudas in his stage shows all over the world.  She recorded her first song, "Kannezhuthy Pottuthottu" when she was in the sixth standard. The song was composed by M. K. Arjunan for the 1975 Malayalam movie Tourist Bungalow. She recorded songs for Shyam in Kamam Krodham Moham and Salil Chowdhury in Aparadhi. Around this time, composer M. G. Radhakrishnan got her to record many non-film songs; the biggest hit among them was "Odakkuzhal Vili".

She debuted in Tamil through the song "Kaadhal Oviyam Kandein" from Kavikuyil (1977), tuned in Hameer Kalyani raga by Illayaraja, but it was not included in the film. Her first released song in Tamil was "Kalai Paniyil" from the Tamil film Gaayathri (1977), starring Sridevi and Rajinikanth with music by Ilaiyaraja.  She sang for Ilaiyaraaja in Johnny, Kavikuyil and Ilamai Kolangal. After her marriage in 1981, she took a sabbatical from playback singing. She made a successful comeback in 1988 through Kadathanadan Ambadi, followed by the hit Chithram.

She used to sing ad jingles in the late 1980s for A. R. Rahman (such as the Premiere Cooker ad and the Tilda Rice ad). Then Rahman got her to sing "Pudhu Vellai Mazhai" from Mani Ratnam's 1992 film Roja, which became one of the biggest hit songs in India. The backing vocals for the song "Kadhal Roja" were also performed by Sujatha. She has had other hit songs, most of them with Rahman from films including Pudhiya Mugam (1992), Gentleman (1993), Jeans and Minsaara Kanavu (1997). She has also recorded some songs in Hindi, including "Dil Hai Sanam" (the Hindi version of "Thee Thee") from Chor Chor (Thiruda Thiruda), "Ishq Bina" from Taal, "Hai Jaana" from Pukar and "Ishwar Allah" from Earth, and provided backing vocals for the song "Tum Ho Meri Nigahom" from Kabhi Na Kabhi, all of them composed by A. R. Rahman. She has had many of her notable and successful songs under the musical direction of A. R. Rahman. 
Her husky voice has given her huge number of fans across.

She made a strong comeback in the Malayalam film industry in the mid-1990s and most of her notable Malayalam songs were composed by Vidyasagar. Most of her hit songs from Telugu are composed by Mani Sharma. She was also a judge in munch star singer junior, IDEA star singer, AIRTEL super singer (VIJAY TV).

Discography

Awards
Sujatha has received several awards and recognitions for her work in the South Indian film musical world. She has been awarded the Kalaimamani award by the Government of Indian state Tamil Nadu in 2021. She was also awarded Kerala, Tamil Nadu state awards.

Kerala State Film Awards

Tamil Nadu State Film Awards

Kerala Film Critics Award

South Indian International Movie Awards

Asianet Film Awards

Other prominent awards & nominations
 1997 - Dinakaran Cinema Awards for Best Female Playback Singer - Surya Vamsam
 1997 - Cinema Express Awards for Best Female Playback Singer - Surya Vamsam
 1998 - Dinakaran Cinema Awards for Best Female Playback Singer - Unnidathil Ennai Koduthen
 2015 – Asiavision Awards for Best Female Playback Singer – Ottamandaram
 2014 – Thikkurishi Award (shared with Shewta) for movie Ottamandaram
 2013 – JFW magazine Women Achievers Award.
 2009 – Swaralaya Yesudas Award
 2008 – Best female singer award in GMMA (Gulf Malayalam Music Awards) 
 The Film Critics award 11 times

 Vanitha award for 'Kallai Kadavathu' in 'Perumazhakkalam'
 Mathrubhoomi Award for 'Kallai Kadavathu' in 'Perumazhakkalam'
 Raju Pilakkad Film Award
 Lifetime Achievement Award from Zee Tamil saregamapa little champs she got the award from her mother
 South Indian Bank women's achiever's award 2017
Mirchi Music Awards 2018: Lifetime achievement
 Kamukara Purushothaman Kamukara Award 2019: Lifetime achievement (Award from P. Susheela)
 Kalaimamani 2021

Malayalam album songs
 "Ilamyel Kondu Njaan" – Ithal (2016)
 "Maayumee thaazvarayooram" – Album (2015)
 "Vaadyaghosham" – Kerala Piravi Day (2014)
 "Kanna Neeyengupoi" – Nandagopalam (2013)
 "Kayalthirakalil Kanneeralakalil" – Kulirmazhayai (2011)
 "Athramel Athramel" – Danaha (2011)
 "Ravereyayittum" – Pranayamarmaram (2009)
 "Ee Manjil" – Spandanam (2010)
 "Ennennum" – (2010)
 "Manju Peyyume" – Purple (2009)

TV shows
She has Judged several popular reality shows over South Indian television across Malayalam and Tamil languages.
As Judge

References

External links

Sujatha's official website
 Sujatha's Instagram Profile

Living people
Indian women playback singers
Kerala State Film Award winners
Telugu playback singers
Tamil playback singers
Malayalam playback singers
Kannada playback singers
Tamil Nadu State Film Awards winners
Bollywood playback singers
Film musicians from Kerala
20th-century Indian singers
Singers from Thiruvananthapuram
21st-century Indian singers
Women musicians from Kerala
20th-century Indian women singers
21st-century Indian women singers
1963 births
St. Teresa's College alumni